The 2016 Louisiana Tech Bulldogs football team represented Louisiana Tech University in the 2016 NCAA Division I FBS football season. The Bulldogs played their home games at the Joe Aillet Stadium in Ruston, Louisiana, and competed in the West Division of Conference USA (C–USA). They were led by fourth-year head coach Skip Holtz. They finished the season 9–5, 6–2 in C-USA play to be champions of the West Division. They represented the West Division in the Conference USA Championship Game where they lost to WKU. They were invited to the Armed Forces Bowl where they defeated Navy.
The Louisiana Tech offense became the first team in NCAA Division 1 history to have a QB pass for 4,500+ yards, a RB rush for 1,000+ yards and two WRs with 1,500+ receiving yards all in a single season.

Schedule
Louisiana Tech announced its 2016 football schedule on February 4, 2016. The 2016 schedule consists of 5 home and 7 away games in the regular season. The Bulldogs will host C–USA foes Rice, UTEP, UTSA, and Western Kentucky (WKU), and will travel to Florida International (FIU), Middle Tennessee, North Texas, and Southern Miss.

The team will play four non–conference games, one home game against South Carolina State from the Mid-Eastern Athletic Conference, and three road games against Massachusetts, Arkansas from the Southeastern Conference (SEC), and Texas Tech from the Big 12 Conference.

Schedule Source:

Game summaries

at Arkansas

South Carolina State

at Texas Tech

at Middle Tennessee

UTEP

WKU

at UMass

at FIU

Rice

at North Texas

UTSA

at Southern Miss

vs. WKU–C-USA Championship Game

vs. Navy–Armed Forces Bowl

References

Louisiana Tech
Louisiana Tech Bulldogs football seasons
Armed Forces Bowl champion seasons
Louisiana Tech Bulldogs football